Nashville String Machine is a musical collective comprising session musicians, based in Nashville, Tennessee, United States. Members of the group have been credited on records dating from 1972 to the present, although the group was formally formed as "The Nashville String Machine" in 1981.

The group was formed by violinist and concertmaster Carl J. Gorodetzky (born 1936/7 in Pennsylvania) and his wife (also violinist) Carol W. Gorodetzky (b. 1937 in Pennsylvania). They oversee the contracting of arrangers, players and studio support as needed; their available supply of potential orchestra members maximizes at 80.

Since the required number of orchestra members changes from project to project, individual members vary. However, there are four members of the ensemble who date from its 1981 founding:
 Carol W. Gorodetzky – violin
 Pam Sixfin – violin
 Gary Vanosdale – viola
 Craig Nelson – arco bass.

The music aggregating website AllMusic lists 1,171 albums on which "The Nashville String Machine" is credited (from 1972 through 2017). The group has appeared as large as an orchestra, or as small as a duo.

References

External links
 
 

Musical collectives
American instrumental musical groups